Kapag Nahati ang Puso ( When the Heart is Split) is a 2018 Philippine television drama series starring Bea Binene, Sunshine Cruz and Benjamin Alves. The series premiered on GMA Network's noontime block and worldwide on GMA Pinoy TV from July 16 to November 2, 2018, replacing My Guitar Princess.

NUTAM (Nationwide Urban Television Audience Measurement) People in Television Homes ratings are provided by AGB Nielsen Philippines.

Series overview

List of Episodes

July 2018

August 2018

September 2018

October 2018

November 2018

References

Lists of Philippine drama television series episodes